Elmer Andrew Lampe (December 11, 1900 – January 30, 1978) was a basketball coach and American football player and coach. Lampe was the head basketball coach at the University of Georgia from 1938 to 1946 and at Dartmouth College from 1946 to 1950, tallying a career college basketball coaching mark of 123–136. He served as the head football coach at Carleton College from 1932 to 1933 and at Carroll College—now Carroll University—in Waukesha, Wisconsin from 1934 to 1937, compiling a career college football coaching mark of 24–11–7.

Playing career
Lampe went to college at the University of Chicago, where he was an All-American football end. He graduated in 1926 with a Ph.B.

Coaching career
Lampe coached basketball at Carroll College from 1934 to 1938. He became head basketball coach at the University of Georgia in 1938, serving until 1946 and compiling a 79–81 record (.494). He coached Dartmouth College's basketball team from 1946 to 1950, tallying a 44–55 mark (.444).

Lampe began coaching college football in 1931, serving as ends coach for Glenn Thistlethwaite at the University of Wisconsin–Madison. In 1932 and 1933, he was head football coach at Carleton College.  Lampe became the 18th head football coach for the Carroll College in 1934, serving until 1937. His career football coaching record at Carroll was 17–7–4.

Head coaching record

Football

Basketball

Works
 Elmer A. Lampe, "How to Play Defensive End." Athletic Journal, v. 9, p. 51 (1928).
 Elmer A. Lampe, "Statistics as an Aid to Football Strategy," Scholastic Coach, 21:14, April 1952.

References

1900 births
1978 deaths
American football ends
American men's basketball coaches
American men's basketball players
Basketball coaches from Minnesota
Carleton Knights football coaches
Carroll Pioneers football coaches
Carroll Pioneers men's basketball coaches
Chicago Maroons football players
Chicago Maroons men's basketball players
Dartmouth Big Green football coaches
Dartmouth Big Green men's basketball coaches
Georgia Bulldogs basketball coaches
Georgia Bulldogs football coaches
Wisconsin Badgers football coaches
College men's track and field athletes in the United States
Sportspeople from Eveleth, Minnesota
Track and field athletes from Minnesota